Catharina Elisabeth Goethe, born Catharina Elisabeth Textor, (19 February 1731 – 13 September 1808) was the mother of German playwright and poet Johann Wolfgang von Goethe and his sister Cornelia Schlosser. She was also known by the nickname Frau Aja and the title Frau Rat.

Biography
Catharina Elisabeth was born to Johann Wolfgang Textor (1693–1771) and Anna Margaretha Lindheimer (1711–1783) on 19 February 1731. Johann Wolfgang was a wealthy lawyer involved with Frankfurt politics. She married Johann Caspar Goethe, on 20 August 1748, after which she moved into his house on Großer Hirschgraben. Three months later, she became pregnant aged 18, and her son Johann Wolfgang was born at the house on 28 August 1749. Goethe was soon pregnant again, and gave birth to her second child, Cornelia, on 7 December 1750. 5 more children followed, but none survived to adulthood. After the death of Georg Adolf in 1761, the Goethes did not try for any more children; each birth posed a great risk to both the mother and child. Catharina Elisabeth's role in the Goethe household primarily involved looking after her children; the Goethes had a servant, a cook and two maids who did most of the household tasks.

Catharina Elisabeth was a pietist and did not often attend church, preferring the conventicle of the pietists instead.In 1774, Johann Wolfgang published The Sorrows of Young Werther, which brought him great fame, and thus many guests came to visit the Goethe household. Catharina Elisabeth revelled in caring for these guests. In 1775, Goethe moved to Weimar, but the Goethe House in Frankfurt still remained a popular spot to visit, with guests wanting to meet the mother of the famed playwright. Many of these guests became correspondents of Catharina Elisabeth, such as Duchess Anna Amalia of Brunswick-Wolfenbüttel and Bettina von Arnim.

Johann Caspar became ill in 1780, and died in 1782, after which Catharina Elisabeth occupied their house alone. She sold the house in 1795 and moved into an apartment on Frankfurt's Roßmark,  in which she lived until her death on 13 September 1808.

Legacy 
She is the heroine of Bettina von Arnim's Dies Buch gehört dem König (1843), and is one of the central figures of Karl Gutzkow 's play Der Königsleutnant.

To celebrate the 100th anniversary of her death, a marble statue was erected of Catharina Elisabeth in the Palmengarten, showing her playing with the young Johann Wolfgang.

In 1876, the first secondary school for girls in Frankfurt, the Elisabethenschule was named after Catharina Elisabeth.

References

Sources 

1731 births
1808 deaths
German letter writers
Women letter writers
18th-century German women writers
People from Frankfurt
Johann Wolfgang von Goethe
Burials at St Peter's Cemetery, Frankfurt